Jan Stanisław Cyganiewicz (April 1, 1879 – September 23, 1967), better known by his ring name, Stanislaus Zbyszko, was a Polish strongman and professional wrestler. He was a three-time World Heavyweight Champion at his highest profile in the United States during the 1920s. The surname Zbyszko was only a nickname, given to him by friends due to his bravery when he was a child. The name comes from a fictional medieval Polish knight in the historical novel, The Knights of the Cross by Henryk Sienkiewicz (published in 1900). Stanislaus Zbyszko was the brother of Wladek Zbyszko (1891-1968).

Early life

Stanislaus Cyganiewicz was born on April 1, 1879 in Jodłowa near Kraków, Poland. A noted intellectual, he studied music, philosophy, and law while growing up in Vienna, Austria. Standing , Cyganiewicz was heavily built, weighing 260 pounds. He also possessed remarkable strength and joined the renowned Vindobona Athletic Club while in college, where he gradually developed an imposing physique. He also practiced in the Sokol (“Falcon”), a Polish patriotic gymnastic society, which centered on the physical, mental, and cultural advancement of the nation's citizens while instilling discipline and a love of country. Towards the end of the 19th century, Cyganiewicz first encountered the wrestling industry when he defeated an experienced grappler at a local circus in Poland. He was soon after recruited to Berlin by a local promoter. As fellow strongman George Hackenschmidt established himself as Europe's premier grappling star, Cyganiewicz was attracted to a career in wrestling as well. He was subsequently introduced to the professional game by the Polish grappler Władysław Pytlasiński, who eventually became his mentor.

Wrestling career
Over the next few years, Cyganiewicz gradually established himself among Europe's fastest-rising Greco-Roman wrestlers while competing in a number of tournaments; and by 1903, Health & Strength listed him among the continent's leading heavyweights. He eventually took the ring name Stanislaus Zbyszko; and in 1906, he battled Russia's "Cossack" Ivan Poddubny to a two-hour draw before then outlasting Georg Lurich and Constant le Marin to win a prestigious Paris tournament. He was next brought to England by Charles "C.B." Cochrane, who was previously Hackenschmidt's manager; and he engaged in a series of prominent encounters against Turkey's "Champion of the Bosphorus" Kara Suliman while performing at the London Pavilion and the Gibbons music halls. However, he was soon embroiled in a major controversy when Suliman was revealed to be Bulgaria's Ivan Offtharoff, who was actually employed by Zbyszko and Cochrane in one of the earliest public revelations of wrestling's "theatrical hoaxes".

As Zbyszko started to compete more often in England and the United States, he increasingly began to make the switch to catch-as-catch-can freestyle wrestling; and for several years, he alternated between grappling styles as he traveled between continents and countries. Already billed as Europe's Greco-Roman champion, he was subsequently recognized among the world's top catch wrestlers when he fought Frank Gotch to a one-hour draw in November 1909 in Buffalo, NY. The following year, he scored heralded victories over Dr. Ben Roller and “the Terrible Turk” Youssuf Mahmout, thus confirming his reputation among the world's elite grapplers while also setting up a huge second encounter with Gotch at the Chicago Coliseum on June 1, 1910 for the undisputed World Heavyweight Championship. However, in the rematch, Gotch tricked Zbyszko, jumping him when Zbyszko walked out for what was in Europe the customary handshake, and pinning him in just 6.4 seconds. Zbyszko was infuriated and protested the result, but the match went on and Gotch took the second fall in just under 30 minutes.  The performance led many fans to believe the bout was a work (although Gotch would never again face Zbyszko during his career).

Despite the controversial loss, Zbyszko was now regarded among the premier wrestlers in the world; and he would then take on the mammoth challenge of India's feared Great Gama, an undefeated champion who had been unsuccessful in his attempts to lure Frank Gotch into a match. And so, on September 10, 1910, Zbyszko faced the Great Gama in the finals of the John Bull World Championships in London. The match was £250 in prize money and the John Bull Belt. Within a minute, Zbyszko was taken down and remained in that position for the remaining 2 hours and 35 minutes of the match. There were a few brief moments when Zbyszko would get up, but he just ended back down in his previous position.  Crafting a defensive strategy of hugging the mat in order to nullify Great Gama's greatest strengths, Zbyszko wrestled the Indian legend to a draw after nearly three hours of grappling, though Zbyszko's lack of tenacity angered many of the fans in attendance. Nevertheless, Zbyszko still became one of the few wrestlers to ever meet the Great Gama without going down in defeat; The two men were set to face each other again on September 17, 1910. On that date, Zbyszko failed to show up and Gama was announced the winner by default. He was awarded the prize and the John Bull Belt. Receiving this belt entitled Gama to be called Rustam-e-Zamana or World Champion. Over the next decade, he competed in Europe while his younger brother, Wladek Zbyszko, established himself among the top stars in the United States.

In 1927 it was announced that the Great Gama and Zbyszko would face each other again. The two wrestlers met for a highly anticipated rematch in 1928 in Patiala, although it resulted in a draw when Gama threw Zbyszko in only 42 seconds.

Championship controversy

By this time, the industry had begun a gradual shift towards works; and Stanislaus Zbyszko was eventually recruited back to the U.S. by the “Gold Dust Trio” of Strangler Lewis, Billy Sandow, and Toots Mondt. Though now in his early 40s, Zbyszko was booked to defeat Lewis for the World Title on May 6, 1921; but his reign was ultimately a bust at the box office, and he relinquished the title back to Lewis on March 3, 1922. Around this time, a disagreement caused Joe Stecher to split from the Gold Dust Trio promotion, thus forming a separate wrestling faction. Zbyszko remained with the Trio, who were promoting ex-football player Wayne Munn as a charismatic new champion. In order to build up Munn's credibility, the Trio booked him to successfully defend the title against Zbyszko on April 15, 1925; however, Zbyszko had secretly accepted a payoff from Tony Stecher (Joe's brother/manager) to switch to their company. Consequently, Zbyszko betrayed the Trio by turning the match with Munn into a legitimate shoot, pinning the non-wrestler again and again until the referee was forced to award the title to the 47-year-old veteran, who then dropped the title to Stecher a month later to complete the ploy. This was one of the last times a World Title changed hands legitimately; and the legacy of this conspiracy was momentous, as it would be decades before promoters would ever feel comfortable putting their title on a non-wrestler again, thus fueling the support for expert “hooker” Lou Thesz to serve as a champion throughout the 1930s, 1940s, 1950s, and 1960s.

Retirement
In 1928, Zbyszko received a lucrative offer to wrestle the Great Gama in a rematch of their bout from 18 years earlier. Despite both men now being well past their primes, the match purportedly drew 60,000 fans, who watched Great Gama defeat Zbyszko in just 40 seconds. Zbyszko then retired and actively scouted wrestling talent in South America, where he discovered soccer, rugby-player, boxer, wrestler and acrobatic gymnast Antonino Rocca, whom he developed into one of the sport's biggest stars. From their Missouri farm, the Zbyszko brothers also trained future legends Johnny Valentine and Harley Race; and Stanislaus had a supporting role in the movie, Night and the City (1949). Knowing that a key role in the film was a grizzled Greco-Roman wrestling legend, director Jules Dassin said he "didn't want to pick an actor and train him to be a wrestler -- I wanted to do the opposite. I had never gone to a wrestling match, but I had an image of a wrestler from my youth."  The wrestler turned out to be Zbyszko. Dassin said, "I was told he was dead, but it turned out he was alive and was a chicken farmer in New Jersey." He turned out to be "a beautiful, cultured, multilingual man" who looked like a graceful rock formation. During breaks in filming, Dassin would travel into town to watch experimental theatre; he later recalled that Zbyszko was the only other person who would tag along (The rest of the cast and crew balked at the invitation). Like the character he played in the movie, Zbyszko often complained of the industry's evolution into a form of showmanship.

On September 23, 1967, Stanislaus Zbyszko died of a heart attack at age 88. He was cited by Strangler Lewis as one of the best legitimate wrestlers of all-time; and as a tribute, his surname was later adopted by Larry Zbyszko.

In 1983, Stanislaus Zbyszko was inducted into the National Polish American Sports Hall of Fame.

Championships and accomplishments
George Tragos/Lou Thesz Professional Wrestling Hall of Fame
Class of 2010
International Professional Wrestling Hall of Fame
Class of 2021
Professional Wrestling Hall of Fame
Pioneer Era inductee in 2003
Wrestling Observer Newsletter
Wrestling Observer Newsletter Hall of Fame (Class of 1996)
Other titles:
World Heavyweight Championship (Catch as Catch Can version) (3 times)
World Greco-Roman Heavyweight Championship

Filmography

References

External links

1879 births
1967 deaths
Polish professional wrestlers
Professional Wrestling Hall of Fame and Museum
People associated with physical culture
People from Dębica County
American catch wrestlers
American people of Polish descent
Sportspeople from Podkarpackie Voivodeship
20th-century professional wrestlers
Austro-Hungarian emigrants to the United States